Greg Croudis (born 14 January 1993) is a New Zealand cricketer. He made his List A debut for Otago on 15 January 2017 in the 2016–17 Ford Trophy. He made his first-class debut for Otago on 21 March 2017 in the 2016–17 Plunket Shield season.

References

External links
 

1993 births
Living people
New Zealand cricketers
Otago cricketers
Place of birth missing (living people)